Ponmeindanallur is a village in the Papanasam taluk of Thanjavur district, Tamil Nadu, India.

Demographics 

As per the 2001 census, Ponmeindanallur had a total population of 619 with 304 males and 315 females. The sex ratio was 1036. The literacy rate was 51.39.

References 

 

Villages in Thanjavur district